George Joseph Hochbrueckner (born September 20, 1938) is a former Democratic member of the United States House of Representatives from New York, serving four terms in office from 1987 to 1995.

Education and career
After graduating high school in 1956, Hochbrueckner served in the United States Navy as an Aviation Electronics Technician until he was honorably discharged in 1959. He attended college for  years, including the State University of New York at Stony Brook, Hofstra University, and California State University, Northridge. He then pursued on the job training as an engineer, working for Litton and Teledyne in California and Grumman in New York.

Hochbrueckner was a member of the New York State Assembly from 1975 to 1984, sitting in the 181st, 182nd, 183rd, 184th and 185th New York State Legislatures.

Congress
He was elected to Congress in 1986 and represented New York's 1st congressional district from January 3, 1987, until January 3, 1995. He lost his seat to Michael P. Forbes during the Republican Revolution of 1994.

Later career 
After Congress, he worked as a Senior Policy Advisor at Nossaman LLP, working out of their Washington, D.C., office.

Personal life
Hochbrueckner and his wife Carol were married in 1961. They lived in California from 1961 to 1968, then returned to Long Island.

References

External links

1938 births
Living people
Democratic Party members of the New York State Assembly
United States Navy sailors
Hofstra University alumni
Democratic Party members of the United States House of Representatives from New York (state)
Military personnel from New York City
20th-century American politicians
People from Coram, New York
Members of Congress who became lobbyists